Herpeperas is a genus of moths of the family Erebidae. The genus was erected by George Hampson in 1926.

Species
Herpeperas amaniensis Pinhey, 1956 Tanzania
Herpeperas atra Viette, 1962 Madagascar
Herpeperas atrapex Hampson, 1926 Ghana
Herpeperas barnesi Pinhey, 1968 southern Africa, Zimbabwe, Tanzania
Herpeperas excurvata Gaede, 1940 Fernando Po
Herpeperas griseoapicata Gaede, 1940 western Africa
Herpeperas lavendula Hampson, 1926 southern Nigeria
Herpeperas phoenopasta Hampson, 1926 southern Nigeria
Herpeperas rectalis Gaede, 1940 Malawi
Herpeperas rudis (Walker, 1865) Sierra Leone, Gambia, southern Africa
Herpeperas tanda Viette, 1962 Madagascar
Herpeperas violaris Hampson, 1926 Malawi, Zambia, Zimbabwe

References

Calpinae